The Bob Thomas Equestrian Center is an equestrian center located on the Florida State Fairgrounds in East Lake-Orient Park, Florida.

The center "includes exercise grounds, warm-up rings, two show rings, and a grand prix ring." In addition, the center has a "9,000 square foot indoor pavilion" that "can accommodate exhibitor banquet and festival seating overlooking the show rings, all in a climate-controlled environment." There's also 471 permanent stalls in five barns, plus plenty of parking and a full-service restaurant.

Bob Thomas and his friend Olin Mott raised the money to build the facility.

See also
Florida State Fair

External links
Bob Thomas Equestrian Center- official site.

Florida culture
Sports venues in Tampa, Florida
Florida State Fair